Lüttge is a surname. Notable people with the surname include:

Andreas Lüttge, American chemist
Johanna Lüttge (born 1936), German shot putter
Marion Lüttge (born 1941), German javelin thrower, sister-in-law of Johanna
Rudi Lüttge (1922–2016), German racewalker